John Nash Douglas Bush (1896–1983) was a literary critic and literary historian.  He taught for most of his life at Harvard University, where his students included many of the most prominent scholars, writers, and academics of several generations, including Walter Jackson Bate, Neil Rudenstine, Paul Auster and Aharon Lichtenstein.  Students from the 60's report that Bush would sometimes speak in decasyllables, so that it was hard to tell where his recitation of Milton left off and where his commentary began.

Bush's textual criticism on Shakespeare and John Milton was widely influential. His English Literature in the Earlier Seventeenth Century remains a standard reference work.

He received his doctorate from Harvard University in 1923.

Major works
The Renaissance and English Humanism (1939)
English Literature in the Earlier Seventeenth Century, 1600-1660 (1st ed. 1945, 2d ed. 1962)
Science and English Poetry: A Historical Sketch, 1590-1950 (1950)
Classical Influences in Renaissance Literature (1952)
Prefaces to Renaissance Literature (1965)
Engaged and Disengaged (1966)

Editions
John Keats. Selected Poems and Letters (1959)
John Milton. The Complete Poetical Works (1965)
''A Variorum Commentary on the Poems of John Milton." Volume I: The Latin and Greek Poems (1970)

References

External links


1896 births
1983 deaths
Harvard University faculty
American literary critics
Harvard University alumni
Corresponding Fellows of the British Academy